Ashwin, also known as Ashoj, is the sixth month in the Bikram Sambat, the official Nepali calendar. This month coincides with September 17 to October 17 of the Western Calendar and is 31 days long.

Ashwin is the month of the 15-day harvest festival Dashain, Nepal's main festival.  Most of people are free in this month, Nepal's holiday month.

Being mostly based on Hindu calendar, Nepali calendar's festival dates are flexible. Important events are:

around September 19: Ashoj 3, Ghatasthapana, First Day of Dashain (Public Holiday in Nepal)
around September 25: Ashoj 9, Fulpati, Seventh day of Dashain (Public Holiday in Nepal)
around September 26: Ashoj 10, Ashtami, Eighth day of Dashain (Public Holiday in Nepal)
around September 27: Ashoj 11, Nawami, Ninth day of Dashain (Public Holiday in Nepal)
around September 28: Ashoj 12, Vijaya Dashami, Tenth and main day of Dashain (Public Holiday in Nepal)

Months in Nepali calendar

References
Best Nepali Calendar
Nepali Calendar
Nepali Calendar
Asoj calendar and festivals
Full Nepali Calendar with festivals
Rajan Nepali date converter
Nepali Calendar

Nepali calendar